SS Umbria (formerly SS Bahia Blanca) was a maritime transport built in 1912 in Hamburg, Germany which plied the routes between Europe and Argentina. In 1918 the ship was acquired by the Argentinean Government and transported various goods (notably coal and agriculture products) across the Atlantic until 1934. In 1935 she was purchased by the Italian Government and renamed Umbria. On 3 June 1940 she arrived at Port Said, Egypt which was controlled by the British. She was secretly carrying 6000 tons of bombs, 600 cases of detonators, 100 tons of various weapons, over 2000 tons of cement and three Fiat 1100 cars. Although expected to enter the war, Italy was still technically neutral, so on June 6th Umbria was allowed to continue her way. On June 9th British warships HMS Grimsby and HMS Leander forced Umbria to anchor at Wingate reef near Port Sudan, Sudan on the pretext for searching for contraband. Shortly after that Umbria's captain, Lorenzo Muiesan, heard on the radio that Italy had joined the war with Nazi Germany. He asked the British guards for permission to do a muster drill and with the help of the crew scuttled the ship. She is often visited by scuba divers and is considered to be one of the best wreck dives in the world.

References
 <https://www.blueforcefleet.com/blog/umbria-wreck/ /, The Umbria, the exciting story of one of the best wrecks in the world. >	

Shipwrecks in the Red Sea
World War II shipwrecks in the Indian Ocean
Maritime incidents in June 1940
1911 ships